The 2017 Icelandic Women's Football Cup, also known as Borgunarbikar kvenna for sponsorship reasons, was the 37th edition of the Icelandic national football cup. ÍBV were winners after beating Stjarnan in the final.

Calendar
Below are the dates for each round as given by the official schedule:

First round
12 teams began the cup in the first round, with 8 teams coming from 2. deild kvenna (second division) and 4 teams from 1. deild kvenna (first division).

|colspan="3" style="background-color:#97DEFF"|6 May 2017

|-
|colspan="3" style="background-color:#97DEFF"|7 May 2017

|}

Second round

The second round will be played 22–23 May 2017. 12 teams will compete, 6 winners from the first round and 6 teams from 1. deild kvenna.

|colspan="3" style="background-color:#97DEFF"|22 May 2017

|-
|colspan="3" style="background-color:#97DEFF"|23 May 2017

|}

Round of 16

The Round of 16 will be played 2–3 June 2017.

Quarter-finals

The quarter-finals will be played 23–24 June 2017.

Semi-finals

The semi-finals will be played 13 August 2017.

Final

The Final will be played 9 September 2017.

Top goalscorers

References

External links

2017 in Icelandic women's football
2017 domestic association football cups